Martin Kaalma (born 14 April 1977 in Tallinn) is an Estonian professional footballer, who plays in Estonian Meistriliiga, for Paide Linnameeskond. He plays the position of goalkeeper and has been capped in the Estonia national football team 35 times. He played in FC Flora Tallinn for years, before falling out of the club and national team and joining Narva Trans for a 1-year spell in 2006. He then moved to Levadia Tallinn.

Honours

Club
 FC Flora Tallinn
 Estonian Top Division: 1998, 2001, 2002, 2003
 Estonian Cup: 1998
 FC Levadia Tallinn
 Estonian Top Division: 2007, 2008, 2009
 Estonian Cup: 2007

References

External links
 
Profile on Soccernet.ee

1977 births
Footballers from Tallinn
Living people
Viljandi JK Tulevik players
FC Flora players
FCI Levadia Tallinn players
FC Norma Tallinn players
Estonian footballers
Estonia international footballers
JK Narva Trans players
Paide Linnameeskond players
FCI Levadia U21 players
Association football goalkeepers
JK Tervis Pärnu players
FC Kuressaare players
Meistriliiga players
JK Pantrid Tallinn players